Fundin may refer to:

People
Eva Fundin (1777-1800), Swedish actress and dancer
Ove Fundin (born 1933), a Swedish speedway rider
Wilhelmina Fundin (1819-1911), a Swedish operatic soprano

Places
Fundin (lake), a lake in Trøndelag and Innlandet counties in Norway